Pinawa is a local government district and small community of 1,331 residents (2016 census) located in southeastern Manitoba, Canada. It is 110 kilometres north-east of Winnipeg. The town is situated on the Canadian Shield within the western boundary of Whiteshell Provincial Park, which lies near the Manitoba-Ontario provincial boundary. Administratively, the town includes the surrounding area, and is officially the Local Government District of Pinawa. Except for a small eastern border with the unorganized area of the Eastman Region, it is surrounded by the Rural Municipalities of Lac du Bonnet to the north and Whitemouth to the south, but is independent of either one. The community lies on the north bank of the Winnipeg River in the southeastern part of the Local Government District.

History

The community of Pinawa was established in 1901 to support the operation of an early hydroelectric generating station but was abandoned in 1951 when the site was shut down.

Pinawa was re-established about 10 km from the original Hydro town in 1963 when Atomic Energy of Canada Limited built the Whiteshell Laboratories nuclear research facility in the area.  Pinawa was chosen as the site for the research station due to the seismic stability of the area.  Pinawa was developed as a planned community which preserved many of the natural features of the site and designated all riverfront property as public reserve.

Whiteshell Laboratories was somewhat similar to the Chalk River Nuclear Laboratories in Chalk River, Ontario.  AECL began decommissioning the Whiteshell Laboratories in 1998.  The economy of Pinawa is diversifying and now includes small recreation and resort businesses and a number of environmental science firms.

Geography
Pinawa is located beside the Winnipeg River, which offers access to boating, kayaking, canoeing, and other water recreational activities. Other attractions include an 18-hole golf course, beach, outdoor pool, tennis courts, a curling rink, a hockey arena and many kilometres of cross-country ski trails.

The Trans-Canada Trail runs through the town of Pinawa along the Riverside. Pinawa also hosts the Eastern Manitoba Concert Association or EMCA's concerts, held in the community centre's gymnasium in the secondary school building once a month between October and April.

Pinawa is also home to an abundance of wildlife, including deer, bears, and other species. The people of Pinawa are very familiar with white-tailed deer, although their views on them may differ. Five deer in the backyard is a common sight there, and the town is known as the Deer Capital of Manitoba.

Climate
Pinawa has a humid continental climate (Köppen climate classification Dfb) with warm summers and severely cold winters. Precipitation is moderate, but is somewhat higher in summer than at other times of the year.

Demographics 

Infrastructure 
Pinawa has a full service hospital with 24 hour emergency service, doctors' offices, and an ambulance station. There is a small shopping centre with a post office, credit union, grocery store, bakery, hairdresser, and the offices. The town also has a motel, a conference centre, and an art gallery.

Education

Pinawa has two schools: F.W. Gilbert Elementary School for students in Kindergarten up to grade six, with about 85 students, and Pinawa Secondary School for grades 7–12, with about 110 students. The schools of Pinawa comprise their own school district, the School District of Whiteshell.

Pinawa Secondary School is located near the elementary school, and is well known in the Whiteshell area for its outstanding Pinawa Panther sports teams and a unique outdoor education program that takes full advantage of the surrounding wilderness.  Students are involved in basketball, soccer, volleyball, badminton, and travel club as well as academic sports like Reach For The Top and community service activities such as the LIVE volunteer group.

Pinawa was also selected as host for one day of the Kraft Celebration Tour during the summer of 2010, which saw Dan O'Toole and Jay Onrait host TSN's SportsCentre in the town on August 23. The town also received a cheque for $25,000 from Kraft Canada which went towards renovating their local rink, the Orville Acres Arena.

Notable people
 Robin Black, MMA commentator, musician
Andrew Davidson (author), writer

References

External links 
 Pinawa
 Map of Pinawa LGD at Statcan

Local government districts in Manitoba
Populated places in Eastman Region, Manitoba